The 11th People's Choice Awards, honoring the best in popular culture for 1984, were held in 1985. They were broadcast on CBS.

Winners

Favorite Motion Picture Actress:
Meryl Streep

Favorite Children's TV Program:
Sesame Street

Favorite Female Performer in a New TV Program:
Phylicia Rashad,
Angela Lansbury

Favorite Motion Picture Actor:
Clint Eastwood

Favorite Country/Western Music Performer:
Kenny Rogers

Favorite All-Around Male Entertainer:
Eddie Murphy,
Tom Selleck

Favorite Female TV Performer:
Joan Collins,
Linda Evans

Favorite TV Dramatic Program:
Dynasty

Favorite Male TV Performer:
Tom Selleck

Favorite New TV Comedy Program:
The Cosby Show

Favorite Young TV Performer:
Emmanuel Lewis

Favorite Entertainer:
Bob Hope

Favorite New TV Dramatic Program:
Miami Vice

Favorite All-Around Female Entertainer:
Barbara Mandrell

Favorite Female Musical Performer:
Barbara Mandrell

Favorite Male Performer in a New TV Program:
Bill Cosby

Favorite Motion Picture:
Beverly Hills Cop

Favorite New Song:
"Purple Rain"

Favorite TV Comedy Program:
The Cosby Show

References

People's Choice Awards
1984 awards
1985 in American television
1984 awards in the United States
March 1985 events in the United States